HMS Speedwell was the mercantile Royal George, which the Royal Navy purchased in 1815 and converted to a 5-gun schooner. During her career in the West Indies, she helped capture or destroy a number of pirate vessels, and capture several slave ships. The Royal Navy sold her at Jamaica in 1834.


Career
After her purchase, the Navy spent between 26 August 1815 and 22 March 1816 fitting Speedwell at Sheerness for eventual service as a tender to the flagship in the West Indies. She did sail to the Jamaica Station almost immediately; already on 13 October 1816 the "tender Speedwell" arrived off "Yallaha" as two "Carthaginian" pirate vessels, one a large schooner, were firing on the Betsey as she was sailing to Santa Martha. At Speedwells arrival on the scene the two privateers broke off their attack and sailed away.

There are also records of Speedwell being on the Jamaica station in 1820 and 1825. In between she worked to suppress piracy, in concert with the United States Revenue Cutter Service.

 served in the expedition that included the Revenue Marine schooner  and the British schooner Speedwell. The trio broke up a pirate establishment at Bahia Honda Key on 28–30 September capturing four vessels. They burnt two and sent the others with prize crews to New Orleans. Eighteen of the captured pirate crew members were sent to New Orleans for trial.

In an action on 2 November 1822, Peacock and Speedwell, together with USRC Alabama, engaged pirates, which resulted in the taking of five pirate ships.

Speedwell was acting as a tender to the frigate Sybille, and under the command of Lieutenant W.H.Geary. Speedwell shared with the frigate  in the capture of two pirate schooners on 5 November, Union and Constantia (alias Esperanza), and in the destruction of Hawke and Paz.

One of these incidents may be the source of the following anecdote. In his confessions before being executed on 11 January 1830 in the military fortress at La Puerta de Terra, San Fernando, a few miles south of Cadiz, the pirate Nicholas Fernandez, recalled an incident:-
"We arrived at the coast of Cuba and learned that His Majesty’s schooner Speedwell, accompanied by several barges from other vessels of war, was engaged in securing a key near Cayo Romano off the north Coast of Cuba where a number of pirates had secreted themselves in the woods. Some small craft which the pirates used in other cruises, were captured by the barges … it was expected the pirates would be hunted from their lurking places."

Then on 31 January 1825, Speedwell seized the schooner James. Unfortunately, the prize money notice does not give the reason.

Lieutenant James Cooper Bennett, who had commanded , commanded Speedwell on 5 March 1826 when she captured the slave ship Orestes, and thereby freed 238 slaves. Orestes had grounded near Grass-cut Cay on the Grand Bahama Banks. The crew had taken refuge on one of the Cays, leaving their cargo for several days without food or water. Bennett was unable to get the slaver afloat and so took the freed slaves aboard Speedwell, as well as the master of Orestes, Don Jose Ramon Munio (or Mutio), the mate, and a passenger. During the voyage to Havana, Don Munio died, as did 26 slaves. Speedwell was able to land 212 slaves. Orestes had loaded 285 slaves on 19 January; in all over a quarter of the slaves she had loaded had died.

It is not clear that the Navy formally commissioned Speedwell before 14 April 1826, when Lieutenant Justus Oxenham commissioned her. Lieutenant B. Hutchings took command in August 1828. Lieutenant James Hookey replaced Hutchings in June 1829, and Lieutenant William Warren replace Hookey on 31 August.

On 15 October 1831 Speedwell stopped briefly at Havana. There she reported that she had boarded a slave vessel off Trinidad, on the coast of Cuba. However, the slaver was sailing under a French flag and so Speedwell had to let her proceed as Speedwell was not authorized to detain French slave vessels.

In 1832, Speedwell captured three slave ships:

Slaves rescued

Speedwell captured Planeta a few miles south of the Isle of Pines. Planeta, Salvador Feliu, master, had gathered slaves along the "River Cameroons" on the Calabar Coast. The British and Spanish Mixed Court of Justice, at Havannah, condemned Planeta on 26 April.

The capture of Aquila took place a few miles east of the Isle of Pines. Under the command of Juan Ferrer y Roig, master, she too had gathered her cargo of slaves on the Calabar Coast. Aquila was substantially larger than Speedwell, and had a crew of 70 men. Aquila fought for an hour before she surrendered. The court in Havannah condemned her on 18 June.

On 25 June Speedwell detained the Indagadera a few miles east. She was under the command of her mate, Bartolomé Alemany, her original master, Ramon Casal, having died during the voyage. She had gathered slaves from Onis, Rio Lagos. On 1 July two men rowed a boat to Indagadera while she lay in Havannah harbour. They intended to free Alemany, and her boatswain and steward, who were still on board. However, Speedwells crew were alert; they captured the two men and handed them over to the Spanish admiral of the port. The court condemned Indagadera on 9 July.

These three captures resulted in Warren's promotion to Commander.

Fate
In January 1834 the Navy sold Speedwell at Jamaica for £344 10s.

Notes

Citations

References
British and Foreign State Papers (1847), Volume 22, Part 1. (Great Britain: Foreign Office).
Clowes, W. Laird, et al. (1897-1903) The royal navy: a history from the earliest times to the present. (Boston: Little, Brown and Co.; London: S. Low, Marston and Co.).
 
 State Papers: Correspondence with the British Commissioners at Sierra Leone, The Havannah, Rio de Janeiro, and Surinam concerning the Slave Trade, 1826-27. (1827).
 

Schooners of the Royal Navy
African slave trade
Merchant ships of the United Kingdom
1815 ships
Ships involved in anti-piracy efforts